Rrahman Morina (1943 – 12 October 1990) was a Yugoslav police officer and communist politician. A Kosovo Albanian, he is remembered as being an opponent of Albanian separatism.

Early career 
Morina had a career as an agent of the Ministry of Interior of SFR Yugoslavia, and later on as a party official in the League of Communists of Kosovo. He rose through the ranks and was in 1981 appointed as Kosovo's interior minister, and thereby held the top law enforcement office in the province. In March the same year, in the wake of the 1981 riots in Kosovo, he called in the national police to quell the uprising, without informing or consulting the provincial government. This act contributed to the resignation of Kosovan party boss Mahmut Bakalli, as the latter did not prove himself accountable enough in the eyes of the government in Belgrade.

Leadership in Kosovo 
In 1988, Morina was installed as leader of the Kosovan wing of the League of Communists of Yugoslavia due to the Anti-bureaucratic revolution in support of the policies of Slobodan Milošević, and the subsequent removal of Azem Vllasi and Kaqusha Jashari from the Kosovan party leadership, as he was one of very few Albanian opponents of Kosovo Albanian separatism. 

Morina came to be seen as a loyalist of the Serbian leader Slobodan Milošević, although Milošević originally despised Morina. Years earlier, Milošević approached the Yugoslavian president Lazar Mojsov, furiously demanding Morina's removal from the Kosovan government (and the rest of it). Milošević even threatened to resign from his office as leader of the League of Communists of Serbia, if Morina was not ousted. In 1989 Morina resigned from Kosovo's political structures during the miners' strike.

Death 

He died in 1990, at the age of 47, under suspicious circumstances in Pristina, while attending the constituent convention of the Kosovan branch of the Socialist Party of Serbia. The official death cause was labelled a heart attack, but persistent rumors says he was actually poisoned at the convention.

Personal life 
He was married to Bratislava "Buba" Morina, a Serbian lawyer, government minister, and Commissioner for Refugees of Serbia.

References

Bibliography 
Raif Dizdarević, Od smrti Tita do smrti Jugoslavije (Sarajevo: Svjetlost, 2000)
Viktor Meier, Yugoslavia - A History of its Demise (London: Routledge, 1999)

1943 births
1990 deaths
Politicians from Peja
Yugoslav police chiefs
League of Communists of Kosovo politicians
Central Committee of the League of Communists of Yugoslavia members
Socialist Party of Serbia politicians
Kosovo Albanians
Kosovan politicians
Death conspiracy theories
Burials at Belgrade New Cemetery